Zhang Yesui (born October 1953) is a Chinese diplomat who served as the Vice Minister of Foreign Affairs and Party Committee Secretary for the People's Republic of China. He was formerly the Chinese Ambassador to the United States. He has previously served as Permanent Representative of China to the United Nations in New York City.

Biography
Zhang Yesui was born in October 1953 in Hubei Province and is a native of that region. He graduated from the Beijing Foreign Studies University and studied at the London School of Economics. After completing his education, he entered diplomatic service and was posted to the Chinese Embassy to the United Kingdom in London. Zhang then assumed various posts in the Ministry of Foreign Affairs's Department of International Organizations and Conferences and Protocol Department. In 2000, he rose to become Assistant Minister of Foreign Affairs responsible for administration, protocol and personnel and then became Vice Minister of Foreign Affairs in 2003 with areas of responsibility including policy research, Africa, Europe, North America and Oceania affairs, arms control and disarmament, and International Treaty and Law. In 2008, he was appointed China's Ambassador to the United Nations replacing Wang Guangya.

Zhang is married to Chen Naiqing, who is also an ambassador. They have a daughter. Zhang and his wife were posted to the U.N. Mission from 1988-92. Chen was ambassador to Norway (2003–2007) and ambassador to the Six Party Talks for a year and a half before coming to New York with her husband.

In 2012, Zhang was named Vice Minister of Foreign Affairs; he was later named Secretary of the Party Committee of the Ministry of Foreign Affairs (rank equivalent of minister). Zhang is an alternate member of the 18th Central Committee of the Communist Party of China.

See also
 Chinese in New York City

Reference

External links  

1953 births
Living people
Alumni of the London School of Economics
Permanent Representatives of the People's Republic of China to the United Nations
Ambassadors of China to the United States
Beijing Foreign Studies University alumni
People from Tianmen